Greiggs is a town in eastern inland Saint Vincent, in Saint Vincent and the Grenadines. It is located to the northwest of Biabou and northeast of Richland Park.

References
Scott, C. R. (ed.) (2005) Insight guide: Caribbean (5th edition). London: Apa Publications.

Populated places in Saint Vincent and the Grenadines